3CG Records is an independent record label started by the pop group Hanson in October 2003. "3CG" is an acronym "3 Car Garage" that refers to the building the band used as a recording studio and to the compilation album the band released before its chart success.

History
After success with Mercury Records, the band Hanson was transferred to Island Def Jam with the merger of PolyGram and Universal in 1999. Due to misunderstandings over their second studio album, the band created their own label.

Hanson released their third studio album, Underneath in 2004 on 3CG Records. The album went to No. 1 on the Billboard Top Independent Albums Chart in April 2004.

The band released their fourth studio album, The Walk, through 3CG. In the UK, the record was released under exclusive licence to Cooking Vinyl on April 30, 2007 and charted at No. 83. The Walk was released on July 24, 2007 in the United States and debuted at No. 4 on the Billboard Top Independent Albums Chart and No. 56 on the Billboard 200 album chart.

On June 8, 2010, Hanson release their fifth studio album, Shout It Out in the United States, through 3CG Records. The album debuted at No. 30 on the Billboard Top 200, No. 15 on Billboard Digital Albums, and reached No. 2 on the Billboard Top Independent Albums chart.

On June 18, 2013, Hanson released Anthem, their sixth studio album, and the fourth released on 3CG.

Hanson have said in interviews that they would like to sign other musicians to 3CG Records.

See also 
 List of record labels

References

External links
 Official Site - Hanson.net

Pop record labels
Rock record labels
American independent record labels
Hanson (band)